The Canton of Leforest is a former canton situated in the department of the Pas-de-Calais and in the Nord-Pas-de-Calais region of northern France. It was disbanded following the French canton reorganisation which came into effect in March 2015. It had a total of 23,699 inhabitants (2012).

Geography 
The canton is organised around Leforest in the arrondissement of Lens. The altitude varies from 20 m (Courcelles-lès-Lens) to 66 m (Leforest) for an average altitude of 27 m.

The canton comprised 4 communes:
Courcelles-lès-Lens
Dourges
Évin-Malmaison
Leforest

Population

See also 
Cantons of Pas-de-Calais 
Communes of Pas-de-Calais 
Arrondissements of the Pas-de-Calais department

References

Leforest
2015 disestablishments in France
States and territories disestablished in 2015